The Thames Valley Cavaliers are a semi-professional basketball club, based in the Uxbridge area of West London, England. The Cavaliers, formed in 2011, play their home games at Uxbridge College and compete in NBL Division 1, the second tier of the British basketball system.

History
Formed in 2011, the Cavaliers have rapidly ascended through the lower divisions of English basketball. The club, which started life as the senior team for the Bracknell Cobras junior basketball club, entered National League competition for the first time in 2012. The men's team split from the junior club to form the Cavaliers in 2014, and with an focus on elite player development, the team was promoted to the National Basketball League Division 1 in 2018. In their first season in Division 1, they secured a top 4 finish and reached the semi finals of the end-of-season Playoffs.

The Club are partnered with Uxbridge College, with whom they run an ABL U-19 academy team  and Brunel University.

Honours
D2 Playoff Champions (2): 2016-17, 2017-18
D3 Playoff Champions (1): 2015-16
D3 South League Champions (1): 2015-16
D4 Playoff Champions (1): 2012-13
D4 South West League Champions (1): 2012-13

Home venue
Uxbridge College (2011–present)

Players

Season-by-season records

Record in BBL competitions

References

Basketball teams in England